Givira lotta, the pine carpenterworm moth, is a moth in the family Cossidae. The species was first described by William Barnes and James Halliday McDunnough in 1910. It is found in the United States, where it has been recorded from California, Arizona, New Mexico and Colorado. The habitat consists of pine forests.

The wingspan is about 30 mm. Adults are gray with brown markings. They have been recorded on wing from June to August.

The larvae feed on Pinus ponderosa. They mine the outer bark of their host plant at the base of the trunk. The larvae are whitish and reach a length of about 30 mm when full grown.

References

Givira
Moths described in 1910